The 2023 Viterra Saskatchewan Scotties Tournament of Hearts, the provincial women's curling championship for Saskatchewan, was held from January 25 to 29 at the Affinity Place in Estevan, Saskatchewan. The winning Robyn Silvernagle rink represented Saskatchewan at the 2023 Scotties Tournament of Hearts in Kamloops, British Columbia, and finished eighth in Pool A with a 2–6 record.

Silvernagle's title was improbable as the team was put together at the last minute and they only had one practice together prior to the last chance qualifier. Additionally, the title was emotional for Silvernagle as she was out of competitive curling after giving birth to her son, Kolt in 2021, who spent almost a year in the hospital and endured multiple surgeries.

Qualification process

Teams
The teams are listed as follows:

Knockout brackets

Source:

A event

B event

C event

Knockout results
All draw times listed in Central Time (UTC−06:00).

Draw 1
Wednesday, January 25, 7:30 pm

Draw 2
Thursday, January 26, 9:00 am

Draw 3
Thursday, January 26, 3:00 pm

Draw 4
Thursday, January 26, 7:30 pm

Draw 5
Friday, January 28, 10:00 am

Draw 6
Friday, January 27, 3:00 pm

Draw 7
Friday, January 27, 7:30 pm

Draw 8
Saturday, January 28, 10:00 am

Draw 9
Saturday, January 28, 3:00 pm

Playoffs

A vs. B
Saturday, January 28, 7:30 pm

C1 vs. C2
Saturday, January 28, 7:30 pm

Semifinal
Sunday, January 29, 10:00 am

Final
Sunday, January 29, 3:00 pm

References

2023 in Saskatchewan
Curling in Saskatchewan
2023 Scotties Tournament of Hearts
January 2023 sports events in Canada
Sport in Estevan